Vlad Alexandru Olteanu (born 21 March 1996) is a Romanian footballer who plays as a left back.

Honours
FC Voluntari
Romanian Supercup: 2017

References

External links
 
 

1996 births
Living people
Sportspeople from Brașov
Romanian footballers
Association football midfielders
Liga I players
Liga II players
Liga III players
FC Brașov (1936) players
FC Dinamo București players
Sepsi OSK Sfântu Gheorghe players
FC Voluntari players
ACS Poli Timișoara players
CS Concordia Chiajna players
SR Brașov players
Romania under-21 international footballers